Blas Taracena Aguirre (Soria, 1 December 1895 – Madrid, 1 February 1951), Spanish archaeologist.

Biography 
Blas Taracena Aguirre directed the Museum Numantino (Soria, Spain) and excavations at Numantia. His investigations covered the near zones of Soria, as well as Rioja and mainly Navarra. He continued the works of his teacher José Ramón Mélida, headed the Museum Numantino and held important positions in the National Archaeological Museum of Spain.

In 1939 he was appointed the Director of the National Archaeologic Museum of Spain, till 1943 he was the Secretary of the Institute of the CSIC.

He is the author of an extensive bibliography and has been awarded with several national and international awards. 1918–1919 he was deputy director of regional magazine Castilla in Soria.

Works
 Carta arqueológica de España: Soria, 1941
 Vías romanas del Alto Duero, 1934.
 Reseña histórico-artística de la provincia de Salamanca (póstumo, 1982), con César Morán Bardón

Bibliography 
Pasamar Alzuria, Gonzalo; Peiró Martín, Ignacio (2002). Diccionario Akal de Historiadores españoles contemporáneos. Ediciones Akal. .

References

External links 
Artículos en revistas
Taracena En Cervantes Virtual

1895 births
1951 deaths
20th-century Spanish archaeologists
People from Soria